Viktorija Golubic was the defending champion, but chose not to participate.

Nina Stojanović won the title, defeating Liudmila Samsonova in the final, 6–2, 7–6(7–2).

Seeds

Draw

Finals

Top half

Bottom half

References

Main Draw

Internationaux Féminins de la Vienne - Singles